Tuovi Sappinen (born 8 April 1941) is a Finnish gymnast. She competed in six events at the 1960 Summer Olympics.

References

External links
 

1941 births
Living people
Finnish female artistic gymnasts
Olympic gymnasts of Finland
Gymnasts at the 1960 Summer Olympics
Sportspeople from Turku
20th-century Finnish women